There have been three baronetcies created for persons with the surname Munro, one in the Baronetage of Nova Scotia and two in the Baronetage of the United Kingdom.

The Munro Baronetcy, of Foulis in the County of Ross, was created in the Baronetage of Nova Scotia on 7 June 1634 for Colonel Hector Monro, with remainder to his heirs male whatsoever. On the death of his son, the second Baronet, in 1651, the male line of the first Baronet failed and the title was inherited by Robert Munro, grandson of George Munro, uncle of the first Baronet. The sixth Baronet represented Tain Burghs in the House of Commons and also fought at the Battle of Fontenoy in 1745. He was killed at the Battle of Falkirk in 1746. The seventh Baronet sat as Member of Parliament for Ross-shire and Tain Burghs.

The ninth Baronet fought in the Peninsular War and later commanded a division of the Colombian Army under Simón Bolívar. The eleventh Baronet served as Lord-Lieutenant of Ross and Cromarty from 1899 to 1935. The presumed sixteenth Baronet never successfully proved his succession and was never on the Official Roll of the Baronetage. The presumed 17th and present Baronet has also not successfully proven his succession and is not on the Official Roll of the Baronetage, with the baronetcy considered dormant since 1996. The Baronets were also Chiefs of Clan Munro until the death of the eleventh Baronet in 1935 when the chieftaincy passed to his daughter and was separated from the baronetcy. From 1954, the baronets were styled "of Foulis-Obsdale" to distinguish their Arms and Designation from those of Munro of Foulis. For more information, follow this link.

The Munro Baronetcy, of Lindertis in the County of Forfar, was created in the Baronetage of the United Kingdom on 6 August 1825 for the soldier and colonial administrator Thomas Munro. He was a major general in the Army and served as Governor of Madras between 1820 and 1827. The Munro Baronets of Linderits descend from the Munros of Culcraggie, a cadet branch of the Clan Munro who descend from George Munro (died 1452), traditionally the 10th Baron of Foulis.

Munro baronets, of Foulis (1634) and Foulis-Obsdale (from 1954)

Sir Hector Munro, 1st Baronet of Foulis (died 1635)
Sir Hector Munro, 2nd Baronet (c. 1635–1651) (Last in the direct line of the Munros of Foulis)
Sir Robert Munro, 3rd Baronet (died 1668) (Robert Munro was in the senior line of the Munro of Obsdale family and a cousin of Hector Munro, 2nd Baronet of Foulis)
Sir John Munro, 4th Baronet (died 1697)
Sir Robert Munro, 5th Baronet (died 1729) (From whom descends the Munro of Culcairn cadet branch)
Sir Robert Munro, 6th Baronet (1684–1746)
Sir Harry Munro, 7th Baronet (died 1781)
Sir Hugh Munro, 8th Baronet (1763–1848)
Sir Charles Munro, 9th Baronet (1795–1886) (Charles Munro was head of the Munro of Culrain family, a branch of the Munro of Obsdale family)
Sir Charles Munro, 10th Baronet (1824–1888)
Sir Hector Munro, 11th Baronet (1849–1935) (Last Munro Baronet who was also chief of the Clan Munro)
Sir George Hamilton Munro, 12th Baronet (1864–1945) (George Munro's father was Harry Munro son of Charles Munro, 9th Baronet)
Sir Arthur Talbot Munro, 13th Baronet (1866–1953) (younger brother of 12th Baronet)
Sir Arthur Herman Munro, 14th Baronet (1893–1972), who in 1954 registered the Arms and Designation of Foulis-Obsdale to distinguish from those of Munro of Foulis. 
Sir Ian Talbot Munro, 15th Baronet (1929–1996) (son of Robert Hector Munro, eldest son of Charles Munro, son of Harry Munro, son of Sir Charles Munro, 9th Baronet)
Sir Kenneth Arnold William Munro, 16th Baronet (1910–2004) (son of Arnold Harry Munro, son of Harry Munro, 4th son of Sir Charles Munro, 9th Baronet)

Currently, the baronetcy is dormant according to the Official Roll of the Baronets.  Ian Kenneth Munro is the presumed 17th Baronet (born 1940).

Munro baronets, of Lindertis (1825)

Sir Thomas Munro, 1st Baronet (died 1827)
Sir Thomas Munro, 2nd Baronet (1819–1901). He was the first to be designated "of Lindertis", after the property acquired by the Trustees of his father's estate in 1838.
Sir Campbell Munro, 3rd Baronet (1823–1913)
Sir Hugh Munro, 4th Baronet (1856–1919)
Sir Thomas Torquhil Alfonso Munro, 5th Baronet (1901–1985)
Sir Alasdair Thomas Ian Munro, 6th Baronet (1927–2014)
Sir Keith Gordon Munro, 7th Baronet (born 1959)

The heir apparent to the baronetcy is Zachary Adrian Munro (Born 1992). Only son of the 7th.

Notes

References
Kidd, Charles, Williamson, David (editors). Debrett's Peerage and Baronetage (1990 edition). New York: St Martin's Press, 1990, 

Baronetcies in the Baronetage of Nova Scotia
Baronetcies in the Baronetage of the United Kingdom
Baronetcies created with special remainders
1634 establishments in Nova Scotia
1825 establishments in the United Kingdom